Muntiacini is a tribe of deer, containing two genera: 
 Elaphodus
 Muntiacus

Muntiacini was considered to be a subfamily, Muntiacinae, but is now considered a tribe in Cervinae.

References 

 
Cervinae